Robert Manger (born December 3, 1956) is an American politician who has served in the Oklahoma House of Representatives from the 101st district since 2018.

References

1956 births
Living people
Republican Party members of the Oklahoma House of Representatives
21st-century American politicians